MTV France is a French pay-television channel operated by Paramount Networks EMEAA. It was launched as MTV Networks Europe began to further localise its brand throughout Europe. MTV France (previously MTVF) was launched on 20 June 2000. It is also distributed in Switzerland (Romandie), Monaco and Francophone Africa.

Its headquarters are at Viacom International Media Networks Europe in London with a local office at MTV Networks France in Neuilly-sur-Seine.

History 

Upon launch MTV Europe was available in France. In June 2000 MTV Networks Europe replaced MTV Europe with MTVF in France and other French-speaking territories.
In 2005, MTV Networks Europe further expanded the MTV brand within France with the launch of MTV Pulse and MTV Idol. Other MTV channels are also available including the pan-European versions of MTV Rocks, MTV Hits, VH1 Europe, MTV Base.
In December 2007 MTV Networks France a subsidiary of MTV Networks Europe launched a French-speaking version of MTV Base.
In November 2008, MTVNHD launched in France.
In January 2011, MTV Networks France launched services related to MTV, MTV Base, Nickelodeon and Game One for use on Philips connected TV sets. Each channel offers access to free video contents, news and trailers from brands MTV, MTV Base, MTV Pulse, MTV Idol, Game One,  Game One Music HD, Nickelodeon and Nickelodeon junior.
In March 2016, MTV +1 was replaced by Nickelodeon +1.

VJs
Frédérique Bedos (French Link; 2000-2003)
 Daniela (MTV Total Request, MTV Select; 2003-2006) 
 Guillaume Stanczyk (MTV Buzz, MTV Select; 2003-2006)
Mouloud(MTV Select; 2004) 
China(MTV Select, MTV News; 2004)
Ariel Wizman (MTV Select; 2004)

Former Shows
French Link 
Hitlist France
Hitlist Base
Hitlist US
Hitlist Yo!
MTV Select France
Total Request France
MTV Reaction 
MTV 8
MTV News France
Love Link
Hot Link
Euro 20
Hitlist Rock
La French Night

See also
 MTV Base
 MTV Idol
 MTV Pulse
 Viacom International Media Networks Europe

External links 
MTV France - presentation, screenshots

References

MTV channels
Television stations in France
Television channels and stations established in 2000
2000 establishments in France
Music organizations based in France